Smerinthulus diehli is a species of moth of the family Sphingidae first described by Hayes in 1982. It is known from Thailand, Malaysia and Indonesia (Sumatra and Borneo).

References

Smerinthulus
Moths described in 1982